Dead Bodies is a 2003 Irish drama film by Robert Quinn starring Andrew Scott, Katy Davis, Eamonn Owens, Darren Healy and Kelly Reilly. The screenplay was written by Derek Landy.

Plot
Tommy McGann (Scott) gets back together with his ex-girlfriend, after breaking up with her recently. But later on, the two fight, in which Tommy leaves the apartment as he pushes her out of his way. He returns later to find her dead, realising he pushed her onto the table where she fell and cracked her head. Tommy drives the body out into the woods and buries it there. Soon after, Tommy gets a new girlfriend, who secretly knows about what happened to his old girlfriend.

Cast
 Andrew Scott as Tommy McGann
 Katy Davis as Jean Goodman
 Eamonn Owens as Billy
 Darren Healy as Noel
 Kelly Reilly as Viv McCormack
Luke Mulvaney as Gym Guy #2
Ian "Delicious" Darbey as Butch McCracken

Awards
Dead Bodies was nominated for four IFTA awards and won three for Best Actor in a Film
(Andrew Scott), Best Editing (Dermot Diskin) and Best Sound/Sound Editing (Daniel Birch).

External links

2003 films
2003 drama films
English-language Irish films
Irish drama films
2000s English-language films